Opus 200 is Isaac Asimov's joint two-hundredth book, along with his autobiography In Memory Yet Green (both books were published on the same day, following his 199th book). It was published by Houghton Mifflin in March 1979. Asimov chose to celebrate the publication of his two hundredth book by writing about his previous 198 books, including excerpts from short stories and novels, as well as nonfiction articles and books. Opus 200 also includes three complete science fiction stories, two complete mystery stories and two complete essays.

Contents

Introduction
Excerpt from The Gods Themselves
Excerpt from ABCs of Space
Excerpt from How Did We Find Out About Comets?
Excerpt from Comets and Meteors
Excerpt from Alpha Centauri, the Nearest Star
Excerpt from The Collapsing Universe
"The Bicentennial Man"
Excerpt from How Did We Find Out About Numbers?
Excerpt from "Skewered!"
Excerpt from Light
Excerpt from Please Explain
Excerpt from Worlds Within Worlds
"Good Taste"
Excerpt from How Did We Find Out About Germs?
Excerpt from The Ends of the Earth
Excerpt from More Words of Science
Excerpt from The Land of Canaan
Excerpt from The Shaping of France
Excerpt from The Golden Door
Excerpt from Eyes on the Universe
"The Dream"
"Lost in Non-Translation"
"Light Verse"
"The Monsters We Have Lived With"
Excerpt from Isaac Asimov's Treasury of Humor
Excerpt from The Sensuous Dirty Old Man
Excerpt from Lecherous Limericks
Excerpt from More Lecherous Limericks
Excerpt from Still More Lecherous Limericks
Excerpt from Earth: Our Crowded Spaceship
Excerpt from Asimov's Guide to Shakespeare
Excerpt from Asimov's Annotated Don Juan
Excerpt from Asimov's Annotated Paradise Lost
Excerpt from Familiar Poems Annotated
Excerpt from Asimov's Sherlockian Limericks
Excerpt from Tales of the Black Widowers
"Earthset and Evening Star"
"The Thirteenth Day of Christmas"
Excerpt from Murder at the ABA
Excerpt from Before the Golden Age
"Little Brothers"
"My Second Hundred Books"

References

External links

See also
 Opus 100
 Opus 300

Books by Isaac Asimov
1979 books
Houghton Mifflin books